Phytotope is the total habitat available for colonisation within any certain ecotope or biotope by plants and fungi. The community of plants and fungi so established constitutes the phytocoenosis of that ecotope.

All these words (ecotope, biotope, phytotope and others) describe environmental niches at very small scales of consideration. A suburban garden or village park or wilderness ravine would each be deserving of the label.

References
 Kratochwil, Anselm. Biodiversity in Ecosystems: Principles and Case Studies of Different Complexity Levels. Series: Tasks for Vegetation Science, XXXIV. Dordrecht, Germany: Kluwer Academic Publishers, 1999. .

See also
 Ecological land classification

Ecosystems
Ecology terminology
Habitat